Wall Street Cowboy  is a 1939 American Western film directed by Joseph Kane and starring Roy Rogers.

Plot
Wall Street stock marketeers try to swindle Roy Rogers out of his ranch, when molybdenum, a valuable mineral is discovered on the property, which the villains plan to use for their steel-mining activities. Unable to pay his mortgage thanks to a crooked financier (Ivan Miller), Roy and his friends ride east  to stop the Wall Street crooks.

Cast
Roy Rogers as Roy Rogers
George 'Gabby' Hayes as Gabby
Raymond Hatton as Chuckawalla
Ann Baldwin as Peggy Hammond
Pierre Watkin as Roger Hammond
Louisiana Lou as Louisiana Lou - Singer
Craig Reynolds as Tony McGrath
Ivan Miller as William Niles
Reginald Barlow as Bainbridge
Adrian Morris as Big Joe Gillespie
Jack Roper as Gillespie Henchman
Jack Ingram as Henchman McDermott

Critical reception
Leonard Maltin wrote, "engaging Western with two sidekicks (Hayes and Hatton) touches upon Depression-era subjects of corrupt banking institutions and foreclosures; fun to watch Roy riding in a steeplechase and singing in a nightclub (wearing a coat and tie)"; and Dennis Schwartz wrote, "this Roy Rogers film had an undeserved bad reputation. I actually found it to be one of his better B Westerns, it was at least up to par with the typical Rogers action-packed oater except that the singing cowboy only sang a few songs. It uses the present as its setting. Joseph Kane ("The Arizona Kid"/"Jesse James at Bay"/"Frontier Pony Express") directs in his usual credible fashion and it's ably written by Gerald Geraghty and Norman S. Hall."

References

External links
 

1939 films
1939 Western (genre) films
Republic Pictures films
American Western (genre) films
American black-and-white films
Films directed by Joseph Kane
1930s English-language films
1930s American films